Bernard J. Schaffer (born 1974) is a police detective, an author, and a former child actor who appeared on the Nickelodeon program Don't Just Sit There.  He joined the police department in 1996 and passed the detective's test in 2005.

Schaffer cites Stephen King's On Writing as his favorite book, describing King as "my Musashi," and the Harry Potter novels as his favorite series.

Bibliography
Schaffer has self-published several works, including:
 Women and Other Monsters (short story collection; May 2011)
 Whitechapel: the Final Stand of Sherlock Holmes (a Sherlock Holmes pastiche novel; 16 June 2011)
 Guns of Seneca 6 (sci-fi western; October 2011)
 Ancient Rituals (short story collection; 12 January 2012)
 Superbia (crime novel; 20 January 2012)
 The Kyoshi Scrolls (samurai/zombie novella; 1 February 2012)
 Codename: Omega (novella collection; 7 March 2012)
 Knife Fights (essays and poetry; 22 March 2012), formerly the project titled "Codex Leicester"
 Superbia II (crime novel; 25 March 2012)
 Simple Ebook Formatting in 10 Easy Steps (formatting how-to; 11 May 2012)
 Coordinates to Unmapped Places (fiction collection; 16 May 2012)
 Chambered Rounds (non-fiction collection; 16 May 2012)
 Magnificent Guns of Seneca 6 (sci-fi western; 10 July 2012)
 Overdogs (fiction collection; 12 September 2012)
 Immaculate Killers (sci-fi western; 6 December 2012)
 Grendel Unit: Bad Day at Khor-wa (military science fiction; 2 February 2013)
 Superbia 3 (crime novel; 27 April 2013)
 The Girl From Tenerife (Fiction 15 January 2014)
 Codex Fantastica (anthology 31 May 2014)
 Saokata (fantasy 2014-05-22)
 Tiny Dragons 1: The Sky Dragons (fantasy 2013-07-31)
 Grendel Unit 2: Ignition Sequence ( military science fiction 2014-03-17)
 Grendel Unit 3: Fight the Power (military science fiction 2014-07-15)
 Way of the Warrior: Collected Edition Books 1+2 (Law Enforcement Philosophy 2014-06-25)

He is also the founder of the short-fiction anthology Kindle All-Stars, contributing the Seneca 6 story "Old-Time Lawmen" to the first collection, Resistance Front, and the story "Carnival of Cryptids" in the second collection, Carnival of Crypids.  His upcoming projects include the historical sequel Whitechapel 2: Inspector Lestrade and the Torso Killer, the sword-and-sorcery fantasy story The Widow Sword, and a third installment of the Kindle All-Stars anthology.

References
 The Official Site of Bernard J. Schaffer
 "BJ Schaffer is Dead," Philadelphia Stories.
 Interview with the Fringe Scientist, 21 July 2011.
 Interview with David Hulegaard, 24 January 2012.

1974 births
21st-century American novelists
American male child actors
American police officers
Writers from Philadelphia
American male novelists
American mystery writers
American historical novelists
Writers of historical mysteries
Living people
American male short story writers
21st-century American short story writers
21st-century American male writers
Novelists from Pennsylvania